Chan Pak Lum (born 1930) is a Malaysian weightlifter. He competed in the men's middleweight event at the 1956 Summer Olympics.

References

External links
 

1930 births
Possibly living people
Malaysian male weightlifters
Olympic weightlifters of Malaya
Weightlifters at the 1956 Summer Olympics
Place of birth missing (living people)